Idukki District has four types of administrative hierarchies: 
 Taluk and Village administration managed by the provincial government of Kerala
 Panchayath Administration managed by the local bodies
 Parliament Constituencies for the federal government of India
 Assembly Constituencies for the provincial government of Kerala

Community Development Blocks

Idukki District is divided into eight community development blocks (block panchayats). The community development blocks are further divided into talukas. The blocks are:

References

Politics of Idukki district